
A foreman, forewoman or foreperson is a supervisor, often in a manual trade or industry.

Foreman may specifically refer to:

Construction foreman, the worker or tradesman who is in charge of a construction crew
Jury foreman, a head juror
Ranch foreman, the manager of a ranch, overseeing all aspects of the operation
Shop foreman or plant foreman, the frontline supervisor in a skilled trade, manufacturing or production operation
Foreman of signals, a highly qualified senior non-commissioned signal equipment manager and engineer in the British Army's Royal Corps of Signals
Road foreman of engines, a supervisor of locomotive engineers in the United States
Railroad track foreman, the person in charge of daily activities of a crew related to duties involved in the construction, maintenance, inspection, and repair of railroad tracks in the United States

People
 Foreman (surname)

Places
 Foreman, Arkansas, a city in the United States
 Foreman, Oklahoma, an unincorporated community in the United States
 Foreman, British Columbia, a community in Canada
 Foreman Glacier, Antarctica

Other
 USS Foreman (DE-633), a Buckley class destroyer escort of the United States Navy
 Foreman (software), a systems management software application
 The Foremen, a satirical folk music band

See also 
 Forman (disambiguation)
 Furman (disambiguation)

ja:フォアマン